National Route 360 is a national highway of Japan connecting Toyama, Toyama and Komatsu, Ishikawa in Japan, with a total length of .

See also

References

360
Roads in Gifu Prefecture
Roads in Ishikawa Prefecture
Roads in Toyama Prefecture